Myall is a locality in the local government area of the Shire of Gannawarra, Victoria, Australia.

The Stony Crossing railway line passed the western side of the locality and the Myall railway station was on that line.

References

External links